Maribacter is a genus in the phylum Bacteroidota.

Species
The genus Maribacter comprises the following species:

 Maribacter aestuarii Lo et al. 2013
 Maribacter algarum Zhang et al. 2020
 Maribacter algicola Khan et al. 2020
 Maribacter antarcticus Zhang et al. 2009
 Maribacter aquivivus Nedashkovskaya et al. 2004
 Maribacter arcticus Cho et al. 2008
 Maribacter arenosus Thongphrom et al. 2016
 Maribacter aurantiacus (Chen et al. 2017) Khan et al. 2020
 Maribacter caenipelagi Jung et al. 2015
 Maribacter chungangensis Weerawongwiwat et al. 2013
 Maribacter cobaltidurans Fang et al. 2017
 Maribacter confluentis Park et al. 2015
 Maribacter dokdonensis Yoon et al. 2005
 Maribacter flavus Tang et al. 2015
 Maribacter forsetii Barbeyron et al. 2008
 Maribacter litoralis Lee et al. 2018
 Maribacter litorisediminis Park et al. 2016
 Maribacter luteus Liu et al. 2020
 Maribacter lutimaris Kim et al. 2016
 "Maribacter marinus" Wang et al. 2018
 Maribacter maritimus Kang et al. 2018
 Maribacter orientalis Nedashkovskaya et al. 2004
 Maribacter pelagius Jin et al. 2017
 Maribacter polysiphoniae Nedashkovskaya et al. 2007
 Maribacter sedimenticola Nedashkovskaya et al. 2004
 Maribacter spongiicola Jackson et al. 2015
 Maribacter stanieri Nedashkovskaya et al. 2010
 Maribacter thermophilus Hu et al. 2015
 Maribacter ulvicola Nedashkovskaya et al. 2004
 Maribacter vaceletii Jackson et al. 2015

References

Flavobacteria
Gram-negative bacteria
Bacteria genera